Fonts originally consisted of a set of moveable type letterpunches purchased from a type foundry. As early as 1600, the sizes of these types—their "bodies"—acquired traditional names in English, French, German, and Dutch, usually from their principal early uses. These names were used relative to the others and their exact length would vary over time, from country to country, and from foundry to foundry. For example, "agate" and "ruby" used to be a single size "agate ruby" of about 5 points; metal type known as "agate" later ranged from 5 to 5.8 points. The sizes were gradually standardized as described above. Modern Chinese typography uses the following names in general preference to stating the number of points. In ambiguous contexts, the word hào (t , s ,  "number") is added to the end of the size name to clarify the meaning.

Note that the Chinese font sizes use American points; the Continental systems traditionally used the Fournier or Didot points. The Fournier points, being smaller than Didot's, were associated with the names of the Didot type closest in size rather than identical in number of points.

Comparison table

See also 
 Point (typography)
 Pica (typography)
 Typometer

Notes

References 

Typography
Units of length